The ARIA Singles Chart ranks the best-performing singles in Australia. Its data, published by the Australian Recording Industry Association, is based collectively on each single's weekly physical and digital sales. In 2011, thirteen singles claimed the top spot, including Bruno Mars' "Grenade" and Guy Sebastian's "Who's That Girl", both of which started their peak positions in late 2010. Ten acts achieved their first number-one single in Australia, either as a lead or featured artist: Wynter Gordon, Pitbull, LMFAO, Lauren Bennett, GoonRock, Adele, Gotye, Kimbra, Kelly Clarkson and Reece Mastin. Five collaborations topped the chart.

LMFAO earned two number-one singles during the year for "Party Rock Anthem" and "Sexy and I Know It". The former was the longest running number-one single of 2011, having topped the ARIA Singles Chart for ten consecutive weeks. It became the longest running number-one single of the 2010s in the chart's history. Adele's "Someone Like You" topped the chart for seven consecutive weeks, while Gotye's "Somebody That I Used to Know" stayed at number one for eight consecutive weeks. It became the first Australian single to achieve this feat since Savage Garden's "Truly Madly Deeply" (1997). LMFAO's "Sexy and I Know It" topped the chart for seven weeks in 2011 and two additional weeks in 2012.

Chart history

Number-one artists

See also
2011 in music
List of number-one albums of 2011 (Australia)
List of top 25 singles for 2011 in Australia
List of top 10 singles in 2011 (Australia)

References

Number-one singles
Australia
2011